Islam Adel Aït Ali Yahia (born April 13, 1987 in Kouba (Alger), Algeria) is an Algerian football player who is currently playing as a midfielder for RC Arbaâ in the Algerian Ligue Professionnelle 2.
On April 5, 2008 he was called up by the Algerian A' National Team for a game against USM Blida on April 11.

External links
 DZFoot.com Profile
 USM-Alger.com Profile

1987 births
Algerian footballers
Living people
Kabyle people
Footballers from Algiers
USM Alger players
Association football midfielders
21st-century Algerian people